Hongshuwan South station is an interchange station for Line 9 and Line 11 of the Shenzhen Metro. It was opened on 28 June 2016 with Line 11, whilst Line 9 was opened on 28 October 2016.

Station layout

Exits

See also
Hongshuwan Station
Laojie station
Chegongmiao station

References

External links
 Shenzhen Metro Hongshuwan South Station (Line 9) (Chinese)
 Shenzhen Metro Hongshuwan South Station (Line 9) (English)
 Shenzhen Metro Hongshuwan South Station (Line 11) (Chinese)
 Shenzhen Metro Hongshuwan South Station (Line 11) (English)

Railway stations in Guangdong
Shenzhen Metro stations
Nanshan District, Shenzhen
Railway stations in China opened in 2016